Les Blank (November 27, 1935 – April 7, 2013) was an American documentary filmmaker best known for his portraits of American traditional musicians.

Life and career
Leslie Harrod Blank Jr. was born November 27, 1935 in Tampa, Florida. He attended Phillips Academy, and Tulane University in New Orleans, where he received a B.A. degree in English. He also briefly attended University of California, Berkeley. In the early 1960s, Blank studied filmmaking at the University of Southern California and received his master's degree.

Following his university education, he worked for a production company called Operation Success, making films that he would later describe as "insipid films that promote business and industry." In 1967 he founded his own production company, Flower Films, with the release of God Respects Us When We Work, but Loves Us When We Dance, a short colorful document of Los Angeles' Elysian Park Love-in. This was followed by The Blues Accordin' to Lightnin' Hopkins (1968) and The Sun's Gonna Shine (1968) about Houston blues musician Lightnin' Hopkins. He never went back to work making industrial films and all of his films were independently produced, often with the assistance of grants from cultural agencies, both governmental and non-governmental.

Most of his films focused on American traditional music forms, including (among others) blues, Appalachian, Cajun, Creole, Tex-Mex, polka, tamburitza, and Hawaiian music. Many of these films represent the only filmed documents of musicians who are now deceased.

Blank's films focusing on musical subjects often spent much of their running time focusing not on the music itself but on the music's cultural context, portraying the surroundings from which these American roots musics come.

Other notable films on non-musical subjects include a film about garlic and another about gap-toothed women, as well as two films about German film director Werner Herzog: Werner Herzog Eats His Shoe (1980) and Burden of Dreams (1982), the latter about the filming of Herzog's Fitzcarraldo. The Maestro: King of the Cowboy Artists (1994) and Sworn to the Drum: A Tribute to Francisco Aguabella (1995) were Blank's last two films using 16mm film. He later worked in digital video. One of his last films, All in This Tea, which was co-directed with his creative partner Gina Leibrecht, was a profile of the western Marin County-based tea importer and adventurer David Lee Hoffman. In 2014, his last film How to Smell a Rose: A Visit with Ricky Leacock in Normandy was completed shortly after his death by Gina Leibrecht, and was a portrait of the co-founder of Direct Cinema, Richard Leacock. In 2007 Blank was awarded the prestigious Edward MacDowell Medal in the Arts.

Les's son, Harrod Blank, has also become a documentary filmmaker.

Blank lived in the Berkeley Hills and for more than 30 years he was a resident of Berkeley, which celebrated Les Blank Day on Jan 22, 2013. His company, Flower Films, was based in El Cerrito, Contra Costa County, California.

Blank died of bladder cancer at his Berkeley Hills home on April 7, 2013.

Legacy
Blank was the first documentary filmmaker to earn the Edward MacDowell Medal in 2007, a national honor given to one artist a year. He was awarded in 1990 the American Film Institute's Maya Deren Award for outstanding lifetime achievement as an independent filmmaker. In 2011, the International Documentary Association honored Blank with a career achievement award.

Two months prior to Blank's death, the Hot Docs Canadian International Documentary Festival announced that Blank had been accepted to receive its 2013 Outstanding Achievement Award along with a retrospective of his work at the festival, which took place from April 25 to May 5, 2013.

Archive
The moving image collection of Les Blank is held at the Academy Film Archive. The Academy Film Archive has preserved numerous Les Blank films including A Well Spent Life, Always for Pleasure, and Werner Herzog Eats His Shoe.

Filmography

1960 - Running Around Like a Chicken With Its Head Cut Off
1960–1985 - Six Short Films of Les Blank
1961, - Strike!
1962 - And Freedom Came?!
1965 - Dizzy Gillespie
1967 - Christopher Tree
1968 - The Blues Accordin' to Lightnin' Hopkins
1968 - God Respects Us When We Work, But Loves Us When We Dance
1969 - The Arch
1969 - The Sun's Gonna Shine
1970 - Chicken Real
1971 - Spend It All
1971 - A Well Spent Life
1973 - Dry Wood
1973 - Hot Pepper
1974 - A Poem Is a Naked Person
1976 - Chulas Fronteras≠
1978 - More Fess
1978 - Always for Pleasure
1979 - Del Mero Corazon
1980 - Poto and Cabengo (cinematographer)
1980 - Werner Herzog Eats His Shoe
1980 - Garlic Is as Good as Ten Mothers≠
1982 - Burden of Dreams
1983 - Sprout Wings and Fly
1984 - In Heaven There Is No Beer?
1985 - Battle of the Guitars  
1985 - Cigarette Blues
1986 - Huey Lewis and the News: Be-Fore!
1987 - Gap-Toothed Women
1987 - Ziveli! Medicine for the Heart
1988 - A Blank Buffet
1988 - Ry Cooder and the Moula Banda Rhythm Aces
1989 - The Best of Blank
1989 - J'ai Été Au Bal / I Went to the Dance
1990 - Yum, Yum, Yum! A Taste of Cajun and Creole Cooking
1991 - Innocents Abroad
1991 - Julie: Old Time Tales of the Blue Ridge
1991 - Marc & Ann
1991 - Puamana
1994 - The Maestro: King of the Cowboy Artists
1994 - My Old Fiddle: A Visit with Tommy Jarrell in the Blue Ridge
1994 - Roots of Rhythm (cinematographer)
1995 - Sworn to the Drum: A Tribute to Francisco Aguabella
2005 - The Maestro Rides Again
2007 - All in This Tea (co-directed with Gina Leibrecht)
2014 - How to Smell a Rose: A Visit with Ricky Leacock in Normandy (co-directed with Gina Leibrecht)
1974/2015 - A Poem Is A Naked Person
1967/2015 - Thailand Moment
2015 - Les Blank's Student Films

≠National Film Registry inductee (former 1993; latter 2004)

References

External links
Flower Films/Les Blank official site

"Food Filmmaker Les Blank Puts The Scent In Cinema" by Ann Hornaday, Washington Post, 9 March 2005
Courtney Fathom Sell interviews Les Blank, SouthCoastToday.com, May 7, 2008
 (interview with Les Blank)
Les Blank’s Cinéma Vitalité an essay by Andrew Horton at the Criterion Collection

1935 births
2013 deaths
American documentary filmmakers
Deaths from bladder cancer
Artists from Berkeley, California
People from Tampa, Florida
Cinema of the San Francisco Bay Area
Tulane University alumni
USC School of Cinematic Arts alumni
People from El Cerrito, California
Deaths from cancer in California